Horswell is a surname. Notable people with the surname include:

John Horswell, English polo player and coach
Micky Horswell (born 1953), English footballer

See also
Horsewell